Laccobiini is a tribe in the subfamily Hydrophilinae of aquatic beetles, and it contains 367 species in 8 genera.

Genera
 Arabhydrus
 Hydrophilomima
 Laccobius
 Oocyclus
 Ophthalmocyclus
 Pelthydrus
 Scoliopsis
 Tritonus

References

Polyphaga tribes
Hydrophilinae